The 1959 Pacific typhoon season was regarded as one of the most devastating years for Pacific typhoons on record, with China, Japan and South Korea sustaining catastrophic losses.

The scope of this article is limited to the Pacific Ocean, north of the equator and west of the International Date Line. Storms that form east of the Date Line and north of the equator are called hurricanes; see 1959 Pacific hurricane season. All typhoons were assigned a name and number. Tropical storms and tropical depressions formed in the entire west Pacific basin were assigned a name and number by the Joint Typhoon Warning Center, but the latter was not added if no reconnaissance missions were assigned. Systems handled by the responsibility of the USWB and FWB featured no number.

The 1959 Pacific typhoon season featured 24 tropical cyclones, though operationally 59 total areas of investigation were classified by the Joint Typhoon Warning Center (JTWC); three systems were handled by the responsibility of FWB at Pearl Harbor and the USWB at Honolulu. Three systems were questionable due to lack of reconnaissance aircraft use. In total, the season featured 65 tropical cyclones and areas of investigation operationally, including central Pacific Hurricane Patsy, which was operationally believed to have crossed the International Date Line into the western Pacific. The first annual tropical cyclone report for the western North Pacific Ocean was issued by the agency.

Season summary 

Of the 33 tropical cyclones and 65 total areas of investigation, 18 storms attained typhoon status, which was below the yearly average of 19. At least nine other tropical systems never exceeded tropical storm intensity operationally. Most of the systems were noted to have developed within the typical spawning grounds for typhoons originating from easterly waves within the Intertropical Convergence Zone; the exceptions were Ellen and Georgia which developed from cold-core troughs extending southward into the tropical latitudes. Of the 18 typhoons that formed, five were first detected within  of the island of Guam. Three of the typhoons developed at a slow rate, while three others rapidly intensified to typhoon status within hours. Only four typhoons were small in diameter, while at least three typhoons developed to large sizes and became the dominant tropical features during the season. Of the total number of typhoons, 215 reconnaissance missions were flown into the storms, including 3,799 observations and 391 total fixes.

Systems

Tropical Storm Ruby 

Ruby weakened to below tropical storm intensity on March 1 and then turned to the southwest. Ruby did not affect any major land masses.

Tropical Storm Sally 

Typhoon Tilda 

The circulation drifted westward, and reports from the surface showed intensification. On April 14 a reconnaissance aircraft mission estimated winds of tropical storm force, and the third tropical storm of the season was named Tilda. Tilda slowly moved northwest on April 15 as it intensified into a typhoon. Tilda then moved generally to the northwest with minor fluctuations on April 16 and on the following day before turning northward on April 18, when it rapidly intensified. The typhoon became quasi-stationary for 30 hours on April 20, weakening to a minimal typhoon in the process by the next day. After drifting under weak steering currents, Tilda accelerated to the north-northeast on April 22 and weakened to a tropical storm. Thirty-seven warnings for Tilda were issued by the Joint Typhoon Warning Center over the course of seven days. Tilda caused no damage or direct deaths.

Tropical Depression Violet 

Tropical Depression Violet existed offshore Vietnam from June 28 to June 29.

Tropical Storm Wilda 

After briefly drifting northeast, the depression moved erratically northward on July 5, and it made landfall on mainland China east of Hong Kong on July 6. The depression quickly dissipated after moving inland. No reconnaissance aircraft investigated the system, which was one of only three disturbances not monitored during the season.

Tropical Depression Anita 

Tropical Depression Anita existed in the vicinity of the Federated States of Micronesia from July 4 to July 6.

Typhoon Billie 

An area of disturbed weather east of the Philippines organized into a tropical depression on July 12. Moving to the northwest, it quickly strengthened, reaching tropical storm status later on July 12 and typhoon strength. A trough of low pressure brought the storm northeastward, where after weakening to a tropical storm, it traversed the Yellow Sea and crossed the Korean Peninsula, losing tropical characteristics on the 18th. Typhoon Billie caused extreme flooding in northeastern Taiwan, causing $500,000 in property damage, leaving 10,000 homeless in the capital city of Taipei, and killing 1. In Japan, the outer edges of the typhoon caused torrential rains, killing 45 and destroying more than 65,000 houses.

Typhoon Ellen 

At , Typhoon Ellen which reached its peak while south of Japan on August 4, struck the southern part of the country on the 7th. It paralleled the southern portion of the archipelago, and became extratropical on the 9th over the open western Pacific Ocean. Ellen's greatest effect, however, was on Taiwan, where torrential rains associated with the typhoon caused disastrous flooding that killed nearly 700, left tens of thousands homeless, and destroyed much of the transportation infrastructure in the central and southwestern part of the island. Some locations received almost 50 inches of rain in three days, exceeding local annual average totals. The economic impact was particularly extensive and long-lasting due to the widespread flooding of farmland. In Taiwan the event is remembered as the "Great August 7 (8-7) Flood".

Tropical Depression Fran 

Tropical Depression Fran existed near Guam from August 11 to August 12.

Typhoon Georgia 

Just 4 days after Ellen hit Japan,  Typhoon Georgia hit the southeastern portion of the country. Georgia brought more heavy rains to the country, causing 246 fatalities and leaving over 50,000 homeless. Georgia caused torrential damage to Japan's railroad network, and, combined with Typhoon Ellen, produced a damage total of $50 million (1959 USD).

Tropical Depression Hope 

Tropical Depression Hope existed in the South China Sea from August 17 to August 19.

Typhoon Iris 

Typhoon Iris, which formed on August 19 to the east of Luzon, passed near the northeastern portion of the island on the 21st as a minimal typhoon. It turned to the northwest, peaking at  before weakening to a tropical storm. Iris made landfall on southeastern China on the 22nd, and quickly dissipated. Typhoon Iris caused rough seas off the coast of Luzon, sinking at least two ships and killing 89 people. In China, the storm brought torrential rains, killing 720 people with 996 missing in the Fujian province in southeast China; however, according to the National Oceanic and Atmospheric Administration, the death toll may be as high as 2,334.

Typhoon Joan 

On August 25, Tropical Storm Joan formed in the open Western Pacific, and attained typhoon status early the next day. Such winds are dubious, due to the infancy of Reconnaissance Aircraft at the time and the lack of satellite images. It rapidly weakened while crossing the island and the Formosa Strait, and dissipated over China on the 31st. Strong winds and heavy flooding caused 11 casualties and $3 million in crop damage. Property damage was extensive as well, with 3,308 houses destroyed from the typhoon. In China, 3 people were killed and 57 were injured from Joan.

Tropical Storm Kate 

Tropical Storm Kate existed just east of the Philippines from August 25 to August 27.

Typhoon Louise 

Just 5 days after Joan hit Taiwan,  Typhoon Louise hit southeastern Taiwan, and quickly weakened as it moved northward. After weakening to a tropical depression over China, it restrengthened to a tropical storm before hitting North Korea and dissipating on September 7. Louise left 6 dead and over 6000 homeless.

Tropical Depression Marge 

Tropical Depression Marge existed in the South China Sea from September 2 to September 3.

Tropical Storm Nora 

Tropical Storm Nora existed from September 5 to September 12.

Tropical Depression Opal 

Tropical Storm Opal existed from September 5 to September 6.

Typhoon Patsy 

On September 6, reports from aircraft indicated the existence of a tropical storm near the International Date Line. Earlier stages were missed because of a lack of data in the isolated area. A trough moved Patsy northeast. A second trough then developed, dominated over the first, and recurved Patsy northeast. It then slowly headed northwards and gradually weakened. It dissipated on September 10. Patsy's erratic path near the dateline was unusual and no known tropical cyclone had taken such a path over the previous ten years, although that of Typhoon June 1958 was somewhat similar.

The Japan Meteorological Agency's "best track" does not give windspeeds, only indicating that Patsy was a typhoon. The Joint Typhoon Warning Center's report disagrees on location but also has Patsy's maximum windspeed east of the dateline; the JMA's data does not indicate windspeeds. Patsy is an uncommon west-to-east crosser of the dateline. Including only systems recognized by the Central Pacific Hurricane Center, that has only happened six times since.

Tropical Depression Ruth 

Tropical Depression Ruth existed from September 8 to September 10.

Typhoon Sarah 

It continued to the northeast, and dissipated on the 19th over northern Japan. In the Ryūkyū Islands, Sarah's high winds and rain caused 6 deaths and destroyed 6,000 houses, causing $2 million in crop damage. In all of Korea, extreme flooding and storm surge killed 669 people and left 782,126 homeless one day before Chuseok, which is one of the Korea's biggest holidays. Extreme crop damage and property damage amounted to $100 million (1959 USD) ($638 million 2005 USD). Flooding in Japan killed 24, with thousands of houses either destroyed or damaged.

Tropical Depression Thelma 

Tropical Depression Thelma existed between Palau and Guam from September 18 to September 19.

Typhoon Vera 

Vera developed on September 20 between Guam and Chuuk State, and initially tracked westward before taking a more northerly course, reaching tropical storm strength the following day. By this point Vera had assumed a more westerly direction of movement and had begun to rapidly intensify, and reached its peak intensity on September 23 with maximum sustained winds equivalent to that of a modern-day Category 5 hurricane. With little change in strength, Vera curved and accelerated northward, resulting in a landfall on September 26 near Shionomisaki on Honshu. Atmospheric wind patterns caused the typhoon to briefly emerge into the Sea of Japan before recurving eastward and moving ashore Honshu for a second time. Movement over land greatly weakened Vera, and after reentering the North Pacific Ocean later that day, Vera transitioned into an extratropical cyclone on September 27; these remnants continued to persist for an additional two days.

Though Vera was accurately forecast and its track into Japan was well anticipated, limited coverage of telecommunications, combined with lack of urgency from Japanese media and the storm's intensity, greatly inhibited potential evacuation and disaster mitigation processes. Rainfall from the storm's outer rainbands began to cause flooding in river basins well in advance of the storm's landfall. Upon moving ashore Honshu, the typhoon brought a strong storm surge that destroyed numerous flood defense systems, inundating coastal regions and sinking ships. Damage totals from Vera reached US$600 million (equivalent to US$ billion in ). The number of fatalities caused by Vera remain discrepant, though current estimates indicate that the typhoon caused more than 5,000 deaths, making it one of the deadliest typhoons in Japanese history. It also injured almost 39,000 people and made around 1.5 million people homeless.

Typhoon Amy 

Typhoon Amy developed near Yap on October 3. After strengthening and subsequent weakening, Amy struck Japan. Shortly thereafter, the system became extratropical on October 9.

Tropical Storm Babs 

Tropical Storm Babs developed in the South China Sea on October 5. The storm struck the western side of Luzon, before entering the Pacific Ocean. By October 10, Babs dissipated south of the Ryukyu Islands.

Typhoon Charlotte 

An area of low pressure organized into a tropical depression on October 9 to the east of the Philippines. It moved northwestward, quickly intensifying to typhoon status on the 10th. Cooler, drier air weakened the typhoon, and after passing near Okinawa on the 16th it paralleled the southern coast of Japan offshore. The weakening storm turned to the east, and dissipated on the 19th. Crop damage was severe, with 75% of the rice crop destroyed. The five feet of flooding in some areas damaged 618 homes and destroyed 275. In all, Charlotte caused 46 casualties and left 1,068 homeless.

Typhoon Dinah 

Just weeks after Super Typhoon Vera, another northward moving  Super Typhoon was moving northward toward Japan. Dinah's turn to the northeast spared the country, and it became extratropical on October 21 to the east of the archipelago.

Typhoon Emma 

Typhoon Emma existed from November 5 to November 15.

Typhoon Freda 

A disturbance in the Intertropical Convergence Zone organized into a tropical storm to the east of the Philippines on November 13. Freda moved west-northwestward, attaining typhoon status the next day. As it paralleled the northeast coast of Luzon, it rapidly intensified to a  typhoon, and made landfall on the 16th with slightly weaker winds of 120, the weakening due to land interaction. Freda rapidly weakened as it crossed the island, and turned to the north. After passing close to Taiwan on the 18th, it accelerated to the north and became extratropical on the 20th. Freda brought torrential rains to the city of Manila, driving two vessels aground. Crop damage was heavy on the southern part of the island, while 7,600 were left homeless from the flooding. Freda caused 58 fatalities as it passed through the Philippines.

Typhoon Gilda 

On December 18,  Super Typhoon Gilda made landfall on the eastern Philippines. It quickly crossed the archipelago, and weakened over the South China Sea. Gilda made landfall on southeastern Vietnam on the 21st as a tropical storm, and dissipated the next day. Gilda caused 23 casualties in the Philippines from extensive rainfall, and left nearly 60,000 homeless.

Typhoon Harriet 

On December 30, just weeks after Gilda,  Typhoon Harriet hit the eastern Philippines. It weakened as it crossed the islands, and dissipated over the South China Sea on January 2. Harriet brought strong winds and rainfall to Luzon, causing considerable property and crop damage. In all, the typhoon killed 5 and left more than 12,000 homeless.

Storm names 

Three Central Pacific storms developed and were named Dot, Patsy, and Wanda. The policy at the time was to use the Western Pacific nomenclature for the basin.

See also 

 1959 Atlantic hurricane season
 1959 Pacific hurricane season
 1950s South-West Indian Ocean cyclone seasons
 1950s Australian region cyclone seasons
 South-West Indian Ocean cyclone seasons: 1958–59 1959–60

References

External links 
Japan Meteorological Agency
Joint Typhoon Warning Center .
National Weather Service Guam
Hong Kong Observatory
Macau Meteorological Geophysical Services
Korea Meteorological Agency
Philippine Atmospheric, Geophysical and Astronomical Services Administration
Taiwan Central Weather Bureau
Digital Typhoon - Typhoon Images and Information
Typhoon2000 Philippine typhoon website
 1959 Pacific Typhoon Season Animation

 
Articles which contain graphical timelines